Kalkan (Turkish for "shield") is a phased array 3D search and track radar system for low and medium range air defense mission operations.

It is designed and manufactured by Aselsan, a Turkish corporation that produces electronic systems for the Turkish Armed Forces.

Kalkan is currently the main radar of the Turkish Armed Forces' mobile Air Defense Early Warning and Command Control System (HERİKKS) and Medium Altitude Air Defense Missile System Hisar, entering into service in 2008. ASELSAN introduced to the market a new version of the radar, KALKAN-II, and exhibited at International Defence Industry Fair (IDEF) 2017. 

As part of the Next Generation Air Defense Early Warning Radar (KALKAN-II) Procurement Agreement signed between the Ministry of National Defense and ASELSAN in 2016, the acceptance of a total of 11 systems has been completed. The three dimensional radar systems are used as the main search radar of the Turkish Land Forces Command Air Defense Early Warning Command Control System (HERIKKS) and the Medium-Altitude Air Defense missile system (Hisar-O).

Description 
Kalkan-II is a mobile X band phased array 3D search and track radar for point and area defense of critical military and civilian assets. KALKAN-II offers an instrumented range of 120 km and can track multiple targets accurately, adding classification and identification information to each target track. 

Applications
	 Point and area air defense of critical assets
	 Integration to Air Defense Missile Systems & Command Control Systems or a radar sensor in self-operating mode

Features
	 3D Detection and Tracking Fighters, Helicopters, Hovering Helicopters, Unmanned Air Vehicles (UAVs), Cruise Missiles
	 Multiple target tracking
	 Classification of targets
	 Identification of targets with integrated Mode 5 IFF
	 Jammer direction finding
	 Remote operation with Command Control System
	 Transportable with its own tactical truck having power and communication subsystems 

Technical Specifications
	 Operating Frequency : X-Band
	 Instrumented Range : 100 / ≥ 120 km
	 Target Track Capacity : >60
	 Azimuth Coverage : 360°
	 Elevation Coverage : -10° / +55°

Operators

References 

Aselsan products
Ground radars
 
Military radars